Stefan Spremo (born 18 May 1997) is a Serbian football midfielder who plays for Bačka 1901.

Career

Spartak Subotica
Spremo signed his first professional three-year contract with Spartak Subotica in July 2015. He made his Serbian SuperLiga in 4th fixture of 2015–16 season, against Partizan.

Career statistics

References

1997 births
Living people
Sportspeople from Subotica
Association football midfielders
Serbian footballers
FK Spartak Subotica players
FK Bačka 1901 players
Serbian SuperLiga players